Samuel Joseph Lowry (March 25, 1920 – December 1, 1992) was an American Major League Baseball pitcher. He played for the Philadelphia Athletics during the 1942 and 1943 seasons.

References

External links

Major League Baseball pitchers
Philadelphia Athletics players
Baseball players from Philadelphia
1920 births
1992 deaths